This page lists public opinion polls conducted for the 2021 Moldovan parliamentary election.

Party vote 
The table below lists nationwide voting intention estimates. Refusals are generally excluded from the party vote percentages, while question wording and the treatment of "don't know" responses and those not intending to vote may vary between polling organisations. When available, seat projections are displayed below the percentages in a smaller font. 51 seats are required for an absolute majority in the Parliament.

(excluding Transnistria and diaspora voters)

References

Elections in Moldova